Boulder Creek is a locality in the Rockhampton Region, Queensland, Australia.

Geography 
The Dee River forms the eastern boundary of the locality. The land is mostly undeveloped.

The watercourse Boulder Creek (after which the locality is presumably named) rises in the north of the locality and flows to the south-east of the locality where it becomes a tributary to the Dee River within the North East Coast drainage basin.

There is a current mining lease for the site.

History 

The Mount Victoria mine was active in the 1880 and 1890s.

Mount Victoria Provisional School opened in 1904. On 1 January 1909, it became Mount Victoria State School. It had low student numbers and closed in 1914.

Education 
There are no schools in Boulder Creek. The nearest government primary and secondary schools are Mount Morgan State School and Mount Morgan State High School, both in neighbouring Mount Morgan to the north-east.

References 

Suburbs of Rockhampton Region
Localities in Queensland